Aa Gale Lag Jaa may refer to:

 Aa Gale Lag Jaa (1973 film), a 1973 Hindi romantic film directed by Manmohan Desai
 Aa Gale Lag Jaa (1994 film), a 1994 Hindi film directed by Hamid Ali Khan
 Aa Gale Lag Jaa (TV series), a 2002 Indian TV series